The Wisconsin Central Railway Company was created in 1897 when the Wisconsin Central Railroad (1871–99) was reorganized from bankruptcy. In 1954, it reverted to the name Wisconsin Central Railroad Company. The railroad was merged into the Soo Line Railroad in 1961.

History

After a proposed merger with Northern Pacific Railway fell through in 1908, Wisconsin Central was leased by the Minneapolis, St. Paul and Sault Ste. Marie Railroad, the "Old" Soo Line, in 1909. Controlling interest in the Soo Line, along with Wisconsin Central, was held by the Canadian Pacific Railway. Wisconsin Central entered receivership in 1932, declared bankruptcy in 1944, and finally re-emerged from administration in 1954 as the Wisconsin Central Railroad. It was entirely merged into the new Soo Line Railroad in 1961,  which acquired the Milwaukee Road in 1985 and was absorbed into the Canadian Pacific Railway in 1990.

See also
Waupaca Railroad Depot

References

External links 
Soo Line Historical and Technical Society

Railway companies established in 1897
Railway companies disestablished in 1954
Defunct Illinois railroads
Defunct Michigan railroads
Upper Peninsula of Michigan
Defunct Minnesota railroads
Defunct Wisconsin railroads
Former Class I railroads in the United States
Predecessors of the Minneapolis, St. Paul and Sault Ste. Marie Railroad